The Bouyei language (autonym: Haausqyaix, also spelled Buyi, Buyei or Puyi; ;  or ) is a language spoken by the Bouyei ethnic group of Southern Guizhou Province, China. Classified as a member of the Northern Tai group in the Tai language branch of the Tai–Kadai language family, the language has over 2.5 million native speakers and is also used by the Giay people in some parts of Vietnam. There are native speakers living in France or the United States as well, which emigrated from China or Vietnam. About 98% of the native speakers are in China.

Bouyei's characteristics are similar to the other members of its language branch.  It is generally monosyllabic and word order and particles are the main forms of grammar. Bouyei's syllable initials match up closely to the other Northern Tai languages, with relatively fast simplification and merging. Bouyei sentences can be shown to contain many different levels of phrasing.

The contemporary Bouyei script was developed after the abandonment of the Bouyei-Zhuang Script Alliance Policy in 1981 and was designed from 1981 to 1985. It is focused and phonologically representative and takes the Wangmo County dialect as its foundation.

Distribution

China
According to a 1950s survey performed by the Chinese government, the Bouyei language as spoken in Guizhou can be divided into three general dialect groups (Snyder 2008).

The Southern Guizhou (Qian) group – the largest of the three – from the Qianxinan Bouyei and Miao Autonomous Prefecture, which is mostly intelligible with the Guibian and Guibei Zhuang dialects. This vernacular is spoken in the counties of Wangmo, Ceheng, Luodian, Dushan, Libo, Duyun, Pingtang, Zhenfeng, Anlong, Xingren, and Xinyi.
The Central Guizhou (Qian) group – next most spoken of the three – which is spread throughout Qiannan Buyei and Miao Autonomous Prefecture and the suburbs of Guiyang, and is partially intelligible with the Southern Guizhou dialects (it is very similar to the Zhuang dialects of northern Guangxi). This vernacular is spoken in the counties of Longli, Guiding, Qingzhen, Pingba, Kaiyang, Guiyang, and Anshun.
The Western Guizhou (Qian) dialects – the least spoken of the three – which is spoken in the counties of Zhenning, Guanling, Ziyun, Qinglong, Pu'an, Liuzhi, Panxian, Shuicheng, Bijie, and Weining. The western dialects show more unique features than the other two groups. Some western dialects have aspirated stops, which is an uncommon feature in northern Tai languages (Snyder 2008).

Wu, Snyder, & Liang (2007) is the most comprehensive Bouyei survey to date, and covers the following data points.

Qiannan Bouyei and Miao Autonomous Prefecture
Guyang, Changshun County
Nanzhai, Dushan County
Jichang, Dushan County
Fuxi, Duyun County
Gonggu Township, Guiding County, now merged
Danggu, Huishui County
Fucun, Libo County
Yangchang, Longli County
Luokun, Luodian County
Poqiu, Luodian County
Xiliang Township, Pingtang County, now merged
Zhangbu Township, Pingtang County

Qianxinan Bouyei and Miao Autonomous Prefecture
Pingle Township, Anlong County, now merged
Huarong, Ceheng County
Zitang, Qinglong County
Fuxing, Wangmo County
Bajie, Xingyi County
Mingu, Zhenfeng County

Anshun City
Huangla Buyei and Miao Ethnic Township, Anshun
Banle, Zhenning County
Shitouzhai, Zhenning County
Huohua Township, Ziyun County
Nonghe, Ziyun County

Liuzhi Special District
Fa'er Buyei, Miao, and Yi Ethnic Township, Shuicheng County

The Yei Zhuang varieties of Wenshan Prefecture, Yunnan are closely related to the Bouyei varieties of Guizhou. Many other languages outside China with the names "Yei", "Yay", "Yoy", are also closely related.

Vietnam
Bouyei is also spoken in northern Vietnam by several groups, the Bouyei people of Muong Khuong District of Lào Cai Province and in Quan Ba District of Ha Giang Province and the Giáy. Edmondson and Gregerson (2001) has determined their language to be most similar to the Bouyei dialects of southwest Guizhou. The Giáy are an officially recognized group in Vietnam who now number nearly 50,000. Some household registries of the Giáy of Vietnam indicate that their ancestors had left Guizhou 160 years ago during the Qing dynasty, and traveled overland to southern Yunnan and then Vietnam (Edmondson & Gregerson 2001). This coincides with the Miao Rebellion (1854–73) of Guizhou. The Giáy are found in the following locations of Vietnam.

Lào Cai province
Tả Van village near Sa Pa
Bát Xát District
Mường Khương District
Bảo Yên District
Hà Giang Province
Yên Minh District
Đồng Văn District
Lai Châu Province
Mường Tè District
Phong Thổ District
Cao Bằng Province
Bảo Lạc District
Some Giày are in Yên Bái Province.

The Giáy of Mường Khương District of Lào Cai who call themselves Tu Dí [thu zi] can only speak a form of Chinese, and no Giáy. Their autonym comes from their ancestral place of origin, which is Duyun of Guizhou province, China. According to their household records, they had arrived in Maguan County and in Honghe Prefecture about 200 years ago. Similarly, some Giáy of Vietnam report that they have relatives still living in Hekou, Yunnan province, China (Edmondson & Gregerson 2001).

The Pu Nả people of Tam Đường District, Lai Châu Province, Vietnam call themselves the Vần Nả (with vần meaning 'people'), and number about 5,000 individuals (Lò 2012:11–20). They are also called Quý Châu (Guizhou ), Sa Quý Châu, Củi Chu, Pu Y, or Pâu Thìn. The Pu Nả live in the following villages of Tam Đường District (Lò 2012:18).

Bản Giang commune
bản Coc Pa
bản Giang
bản Nà Bỏ
bản Nà Sài
bản Nà Cơ
bản Tẩn Phủ Nhiêu
Thèn Xin commune
bản Lở Thàng
Thèn Xin
San Thàng commune
bản Tả Xin Chải
Xéo Xin Chải
Phan Lỉn

The Yay language described by William J. Gedney is in fact the Giáy dialect of Mường Hum, Bát Xát District, Lào Cai (Edmondson & Gregerson 2001). There are also other related Northern Tai languages spoken in Vietnam as well, such Bố Y, Nhang, and Quy Châu (possibly closely related to Tai Mène of Laos). The Bố Y had originally came from around Wangmo County in southwestern Guizhou. Some subgroups of Bố Y call themselves the Pu Na or Pu Thin, meaning 'people of the paddy field'.

Laos
There are also some speakers in Laos. In Laos, the Giáy people are called Yang, which is also used four various Rau peoples living there.

The Yang people, also spelled Nhang, are located in Louang Namtha Province, Oudomxay Province and Phongsaly Province. This three provinces are bordered by Yunnan, and one border Vietnam.

Phonology

Consonants
The Bouyei script recognizes 32 consonants, with names formed by the consonant in an initial position followed by a long "a" vowel.

Pink: p, t, k, q, z, and c are used only to write Chinese loanwords.

Beige: sl and hr are used for sounds that occur only in certain dialects.

V is pronounced as a  before a "u". 

An absent consonant may produce a glottal sound .  is also heard as a final sound.

Vowels and diphthongs 
Bouyei has 77 vowels and diphthongs.

The endings er , ao , ou , ia , io , iao , ua , uai , and ui  are used in writing Chinese loanwords.

Another vowel sound  may occur phonemically in the dialects of Anshun, Qinglong, Shuicheng, Zhenning, and Ziyun.

Tones 

Marking letters are placed at the end of syllables to indicate tone. Loanword marking letters y, f, j, and q match with Mandarin tones 1, 2, 3, and 4 respectively.

Language shift 
Bouyei shows de-voicing of Proto-Tai–Kadai's voiced consonants ( → ,  → ,  → ), and loss of aspiration.

Proto-Tai–Kadai's tones experienced a splitting into modern Bouyei, shown in the following table.

Scripts

Ancient Bouyei script
Ancient Bouyei writing was created by borrowing elements from Chinese characters or by mimicking their forms, and is similar to Sawndip. Items collected were mostly Shaman's books of the Buyi ancestors, which were used to select auspicious days, lucky numbers and directions, and divination. The scriptures also produced Nuo books and literary works. The Nuo scripts have been widely circulated among the Buyi people in Libo region for more than a thousand years to praise goodness, condemn evil, advocate filialiation, and to promote truth, kindness and beauty; and these have become the code of conduct among the local Buyei people. The epic poem Wang Yulian was a literary work that is believed to be the retelling of a Chinese story in Buyei language. Its manual copies are popular in Zhexiang Township, Wangmo County in Buyei and Miao Autonomous Prefecture in Southwest Guizhou.

Old Modern Bouyei
In November 1956, a scientific conference was held in Guiyang to discuss the creation and implementation of a Latin-based alphabet for Bouyei.  The result was a script similar some Zhuang romanizations that used the Longli County dialect as its base.  The script was approved by the Chinese government and was put into use in 1957, though its use ceased in 1960.

Current Bouyei script
In 1981 a conference on Bouyei history revised the script developed in 1956 in an attempt to make it more practical and phonologically representative of Wangmo County speech.  It also was approved by the Chinese government, and was adopted on an experimental basis in 1982.  Feedback was largely positive, and the script was officially brought into use in March 1985 and continues to be used to the present.

Old and current Bouyei Romanization comparisons

Tone Marking Letters

References

 
 
 
 
 Bouyei Culture Website

External links

 ABVD: Bouyei (Wangmo) word list

Tai languages
Languages of China
Bouyei people